Andouillé-Neuville (Gallo: Andólhae) is a commune in the Ille-et-Vilaine department in Brittany in northwestern France.

Population
Inhabitants of Andouillé-Neuville are called Andoléens.

Sights
The Château de la Magnanne is a local chateau built in the 17th century. The roof has been replaced as a result of a fire in 1893. The departmental archives have preserved the archives of the chateau for the years 1389 to 1790.

See also
Communes of the Ille-et-Vilaine department

References

External links

Pays d'Aubigné site
Mayors of Ille-et-Vilaine Association 

Communes of Ille-et-Vilaine